Coloptilia conchylidella is a moth of the family Gelechiidae. It is found in Portugal, Spain, Turkey and Russia.

The length of the forewings is about 5 mm. The ground colour of the forewings is dirty white, sprinkled with blackish and brownish scales. The hindwings are bright grey.

References

Moths described in 1898
Apatetrini
Insects of Turkey